The 1991–92 Toto Cup Leumit was the 8th season of the third most important football tournament in Israel since its introduction. 

It was held in two stages. First, the twelve Liga Leumit teams, along with four Liga Artzit teams were divided into four groups. The group winners advanced to the semi-finals, which, as was the final, were held as one-legged matches.

The competition began on 7 September 1991 and ended on 28 January 1992, with Bnei Yehuda beating Maccabi Tel Aviv 2–1 in the final.

Group stage
The matches were played from 7 September to 28 December 1991.

Group A

Group B

Group C

Group D

Elimination rounds

Semifinals

Final

See also
 1991–92 Toto Cup Artzit

References

Leumit
Toto Cup Leumit
Toto Cup Leumit